Doiwala Legislative Assembly constituency  is one of the 70 electoral Uttarakhand Legislative Assembly constituencies of Uttarakhand state in India.

Doiwala Legislative Assembly constituency, currently is a part of Haridwar parliamentary constituency as per the delimitation in 2008. Prior to the delimitation in 2008, it was a part of Tehri parliamentary constituency.

Members of Legislative Assembly
Keys:

Election results

2017

See also

 Doiwala

References

External links
  
http://eci.nic.in/eci_main/CurrentElections/CONSOLIDATED_ORDER%20_ECI%20.pdf. The Election Commission of India. p. 509.
http://ceo.uk.gov.in/files/Election2012/RESULTS_2012_Uttarakhand_State.pdf
https://web.archive.org/web/20090619064401/http://gov.ua.nic.in/ceouttranchal/ceo/ac_pc.aspx
https://web.archive.org/web/20101201021552/http://gov.ua.nic.in/ceouttranchal/ceo/ac_detl.aspx

Dehradun district
Assembly constituencies of Uttarakhand